The WCA North Division Two is a second tier league for women in the sport of shinty, and is run by the Women's Camanachd Association. The league was last played for in season 2013 won by Skye Camanachd before a two-year experiment with a WCA National Division Two. However a growth in clubs in both the North and the South of Scotland saw season 2016 begin with return to regional second level set-up with a WCA North Division 2 and WCA South Division 2. All three leagues are sponsored by Marine Harvest. Below these divisions is the WCA Development League but this has no relegation or promotion consisting entirely of second teams and a team from the Outer Hebrides.

Teams
At present, six clubs compete in the league.

Glengarry Shinty Club
Glenurquhart Shinty Club
Inverness Shinty Club
Lovat Shinty Club
Strathglass Shinty Club
Strathspey Camanachd

Shinty competitions